"Hold On" is a song by American pop rock band Jonas Brothers. The song was released as the lead single from their self-titled second album and was released on May 22, 2007.The iTunes Store named this single as number three on their "Best of the Store" Playlist on August 7, 2007.

Background

It is featured on the Disney Channel Original Movie, Johnny Kapahala: Back on Board and the film Free Style.

"Hold On" is featured on multiple Jonas Brothers tours, including the most recent Happiness Begins Tour.

Music video
The music video starts with the band grabbing their instruments and playing them. There, Joe Jonas starts singing as they play instruments. Then while the second chorus is being sung the walls and the roof fly away leaving the band on a windy desert only with their instruments. They keep singing as the wind hits on their faces. The song ends as the wind stops.

The music video was used to promote Johnny Kapahala: Back on Board.

Chart performance
In August 2007, "Hold On" debuted at number 92 on the Billboard Hot 100, becoming the band's second charting single in their career (the first being "Year 3000", which peaked at number 31). The single peaked at number 53 on the Hot 100. In 2008, the song went platinum.

Charts

References

External links
""Year 3000" Official Music Video on YouTube

Declan Whitebloom -- Director

2007 singles
Jonas Brothers songs
Songs written by Kevin Jonas
Songs written by Joe Jonas
Songs written by Nick Jonas
Hollywood Records singles
2007 songs
Song recordings produced by John Fields (record producer)